Florian Panzner (born 20 July 1976) is a German actor who has been active since 1999.

Life and career
Panzner studied at the University of Film and Television Potsdam-Babelsberg. In 2000, he played the role of Truffaldino in the comedy The Servant of Two Masters by Carlo Goldoni at Berlin's Theater unterm Dach.
For his role as Hagen in the 2005 film White Silence by director Philip Hauke, he won the award for best male actor at the 2005 Miskolc International Film Festival.
Panzner played the assistant to the eponymous Inspector Laurenti in the crime series Commissario Laurenti as well as carrying the lead role of Luca Permann in the science fiction television film TRUST.Wohltat. Panzner also appears in the popular Netflix science fiction series Dark.

Selected filmography

Film

Television

Awards
 Best Male Actor Award at the Miskolc International Film Festival for White Silence (2005)
 Grimme-Preis for Mord in Eberswalde (2014)

References

External links
 
 
 Florian Panzner at Velvet Talent Agency
 Filmography at filmportal.de

1976 births
Living people
German male film actors